Caren Totzauer is a German wheelchair curler.

At the international level, she is a  bronze medallist.

Teams

References

External links 

Caren Totzauer - Die Perspektivenwechslerin • Speaker & Business-Mentor

Living people
German male curlers
German wheelchair curlers
Year of birth missing (living people)